Nemophora panaeola is a moth of the Adelidae family. It is found in Queensland.

Original Description

External links
Australian Faunal Directory
Image at CSIRO Entomology

Moths of Australia
Adelidae
Moths described in 1913